Yannick Stark (born 28 October 1990) is a German professional footballer who plays as a central midfielder for Turkish club Manisa.

Career
Stark began his youth career at SG Arheilgen and SC Hasia Dieburg before being signed by the youth department of Eintracht Frankfurt. At Frankfurt, he played with Under 19's in the Under 19 Bundesliga while also featuring for the Under 23 side in the Regionalliga Süd. In only his second season, while being eligible to play for the Under 19's, he became a regular for Eintracht Frankfurt II in the Regionalliga Süd, competing in 31 games.

At the end of the season Stark was signed by 2. Bundesliga club MSV Duisburg but was loaned to his homeside SV Darmstadt 98 immediately. At Darmstadt 98 he helped his team get promoted to the 3. Liga by coming first in the league in the 2011–12 season. In the penultimate game Stark scored the winning goal which ensured promotion with a game to spare. He was then voted "Player of the season" by the readers of the local newspaper Darmstädter Echo.

In the summer of 2011 Stark was signed by FSV Frankfurt for two years after his contract with MSV Duisburg was nullified. He gave his debut on 15 July 2011 in the first game of the season against Union Berlin. Stark featured in 29 games in his first 2. Bundesliga season. In the following season, he scored his first goal for Frankfurt against SG Sonnenhof Großaspach in the DFB Pokal and against Erzgebirge Aue in the league.

In the 2013–14 season Stark moved to TSV 1860 Munich within the league and signed a contract valid for two years.

In the winter of the following season Stark moved back to his old club SV Darmstadt 98 with whom he was then promoted to the Bundesliga for the 2015–16 season.

Stark signed for 3. Liga club Dynamo Dresden in the summer of 2020 following the expiry of his contract at Darmstadt 98.

References

External links
 Yannick Stark at kicker.de 

1990 births
Sportspeople from Darmstadt
Living people
German footballers
Association football midfielders
Eintracht Frankfurt II players
MSV Duisburg players
FSV Frankfurt players
TSV 1860 Munich players
SV Darmstadt 98 players
Dynamo Dresden players
Manisa FK footballers
3. Liga players
2. Bundesliga players
Regionalliga players
TFF First League players
German expatriate footballers
Expatriate footballers in Turkey
German expatriate sportspeople in Turkey